"Mama Look at Bubu" (later retitled "Mama Look a Boo Boo") is a song written by Trinidadian calypsonian Lord Melody,  Harry Belafonte and Lord Burgess, and performed by Harry Belafonte featuring Bob Corwin's Orchestra & Chorus featuring Millard Thomas, Franz Casseus and Victor Messer on guitars. Although Belafonte gets co-writing credit on his 1957 release, the song first appeared on Lord Melody's single "Mama Look a Boo Boo" in 1955 (with slightly different lyrics), and his debut album "Calypso Fiesta – Limbo In Trinidad" in 1956 (retitled "Boo Boo"), with solo writing credit to Lord Melody (real name Fitzroy Alexander).

First heard by Belafonte in the West Indies while filming "Island in the Sun," Boo Boo was an unprecedented hit in Trinidad, the land of calypso. The Belafonte version later swept the U.S. as well. Belafonte's cover reached #10 on the U.S. R&B chart and #11 on the U.S. pop chart in 1957.  It was featured on his 1957 album The Versatile Mr. Belafonte.

Other versions
Steve Karmen released a version of the song entitled "Mama Look-A Boo Boo" as a single in 1957, but it did not chart.
Chubby Checker released a version of the song entitled "Mama Look a Boo Boo" on his 1963 album Let's Limbo Some More.
Leftover Salmon released a version of the song entitled "Booboo" on their 1993 album Bridges to Bert.
The Belafonte Folk Singers released a version of the song entitled "Mama Look a Boo Boo" on their 1997 compilation album All-Time Greatest Hits.
Charlie Gracie released a version of the song entitled "Mama Look a Boo Boo" on his 2002 album An Evening with Charlie Gracie which was recorded in 1998.
A version by Nat King Cole entitled "Mama Look a Boo Boo" was released on his 2003 compilation album Remembering Nat King Cole.
Karl Zéro and The Wailers released a version of the song on their 2004 album HiFi Calypso.

References

1957 songs
1957 singles
Harry Belafonte songs
Chubby Checker songs
Charlie Gracie songs
Nat King Cole songs
RCA Victor singles